California's 35th State Senate district is one of 40 California State Senate districts. It is currently represented by Democrat Steven Bradford of Gardena.

District profile 
The district straddles Interstate 110, including the inland portions of the South Bay in addition to parts of South Los Angeles. The district stretches from Inglewood and Watts in the north down to San Pedro and the Port of Los Angeles in the south.

Los Angeles County – 9.5%
 Carson
 Compton
 Gardena
 Hawthorne
 Inglewood – 87.3%
 Lawndale
 Long Beach – 7.6%
 Los Angeles – 6.2%
San Pedro
Watts
 Torrance – 45.0%

Election results from statewide races

List of senators 
Due to redistricting, the 35th district has been moved around different parts of the state. The current iteration resulted from the 2011 redistricting by the California Citizens Redistricting Commission.

Election results 1992 - present

2020

2016

2014 (special)

2012

2008

2004

2000

1996

1992

See also 
 California State Senate
 California State Senate districts
 Districts in California

References

External links 
 District map from the California Citizens Redistricting Commission

35
Government of Los Angeles County, California
Government of Los Angeles
Government in Long Beach, California
Carson, California
Compton, California
Gardena, California
Hawthorne, California
Inglewood, California
Lawndale, California
Los Angeles Harbor Region
San Pedro, Los Angeles
South Los Angeles
Torrance, California
Watts, Los Angeles
Willowbrook, California
Wilmington, Los Angeles